Anett Kisfaludy (born 31 August 1990) is a Hungarian handballer for Ferencváros and the Hungarian national team.

She was selected for the Hungarian national team first time in the friendly tournament Pannon Cup, and made her international debut on 24 April 2011 against Brazil.

Achievements
Nemzeti Bajnokság I:
Winner: 2009
Magyar Kupa:
Winner: 2009
Bronze Medallist: 2010
EHF Champions League:
Finalist: 2009
Junior European Championship:
Silver Medallist: 2009

References

External links
Anett Kisfaludy career statistics at Worldhandball

1990 births
Living people
People from Kapuvár
Hungarian female handball players
Győri Audi ETO KC players
Békéscsabai Előre NKSE players
Handball players at the 2020 Summer Olympics
Sportspeople from Győr-Moson-Sopron County